The women's 800 metres at the 2016 IAAF World Indoor Championships took place on March 19 and 20, 2016.

Before the qualifying round here, Francine Niyonsaba had never run indoors.  In the final, Ajee' Wilson took the lead at the break, with Margaret Nyairera Wambui following.  Inexperienced at indoor strategy, Niyonsaba was in a frustrating position, blocked by the larger athletes ahead of her, boxed in, exchanging elbows with Habitam Alemu and Laura Roesler at her heels.  On the second lap, Wambui got around Wilson to take the lead.  Niyonsaba had had enough of this frustration, dropping behind Alemu then bouncing out to lane 2 running around the field into the lead, her third 200 so fast she opened up a 3-metre gap.  From there, Niyonsaba simply held the gap all the way to the finish, with Wambui trying her hardest to make up the gap.  Coming off the final turn, Wilson threw her best move against Wambui to outsprint her for silver.

Results

Heats
Qualification: The winner of each heat (Q) and next 3 fastest (q) qualified for the final.

Final
The final was started on March 20 at 13:30.

References

800 metres
800 metres at the World Athletics Indoor Championships
2016 in women's athletics